Kanthari  is a 2015 Indian Malayalam-language drama film directed by Ajmal. The film stars Rachana Narayanankutty, Sekhar Menon, Subiksha, Rajshri Nair, Sreejith Ravi, Manav, Balaji and others.

Cast 
 Rachana Narayanankutty
 Sekhar Menon 
 Subiksha as Sulthana
 Rajasree Nair as Vimala
 Sreejith Ravi
 Sasi Kalinga
 Manav
 Neena Kurup
 Balaji
 Zeenath
 Resmi Anil
 Thalaivasal Vijay in a cameo appearance

Reception
A critic from The Times of India wrote that "The story lacks depth to hook the audience and it stands on a shaky premise throughout".

References

2015 films
2010s Malayalam-language films